Brenda Dietrich (born May 16, 1953) is an American politician who served as a member of the Kansas House of Representatives for the 52nd district from 2017 to 2021.

References

External links
Campaign Site

1953 births
Living people
Republican Party members of the Kansas House of Representatives
21st-century American politicians
21st-century American women politicians
Women state legislators in Kansas
American educators
Educators from Kansas
American women educators
People from Topeka, Kansas
Kansas State University alumni
University of Missouri–Kansas City alumni
Republican Party Kansas state senators